This article is about the demographic features of the population of Vanuatu, including population density, ethnicity, education level, health of the populace, economic status, religious affiliations and other aspects of the population. 4% of the people living in Vanuatu are Europeans.

Vital statistics

Births and deaths

Note: Birth and death registration incomplete in 2012-2014 period

CIA World Factbook demographic statistics
The following demographic statistics are from the CIA World Factbook, unless otherwise indicated.

Population

307,145

Age structure
0–14 years: 36.71% (male 51,014/female 48,940)
15–24 years: 19.94% (male 26,970/female 27,314)
25–54 years: 34.45% (male 45,935/female 47,864)
55–64 years: 5.13% (male 7,034/female 6,932)
65 years and over: 3.77% (male 5,236/female 5,025) (2015 est.)

Population growth rate
1.95%

Birth rate
25.04 births/1,000 population

Death rate
4.09 deaths/1,000 population

Net migration rate
-1.47 migrant(s)/1,000 population

Sex ratio
At birth: 1.05 male(s)/female
0–14 years: 1.04 male(s)/female
15–24 years: 0.99 male(s)/female
25–54 years: 0.96 male(s)/female
55–64 years: 1.02 male(s)/female
65 years and over: 1.04 male(s)/female
Total population: 1 male(s)/female

Infant mortality rate
Total: 15.7 deaths/1,000 live births
Male: 16.77 deaths/1,000 live births
Female: 14.58 deaths/1,000 live births

Life expectancy at birth
Total population: 73.06 years
Male: 71.47 years
Female: 74.72 years

Total fertility rate
3.25 children born/woman

Nationality
Ni-Vanuatu (noun; singular and plural)
Ni-Vanuatu (adjective)

Ethnic groups
Ni-Vanuatu 97.6%
Part Ni-Vanuatu 1.1%
Other 1.3%

Religions

Protestant 70%
Presbyterian 27.9%
Anglican 15.1%
Seventh-day Adventist 12.5%
Assemblies of God 4.7%
Church of Christ 4.5%
Neil Thomas Ministry 3.1%
Apostolic 2.2%)
Roman Catholic 12.4%, 
Customary beliefs 3.7% 
Including Jon Frum cargo cult
Other 12.6%
None 1.1%
Unspecified 0.2%

Languages

First Language
Local languages (more than 100) 63.2%
Bislama (official; creole) 33.7%
English (official) 2%
French (official) 0.6%
Other 0.5%

Literacy
Total population: 85.2%
Male: 86.6%
Female: 83.8%

References

 
Society of Vanuatu